National Highway 118 is a national highway of India. It connects Asanbani and Jamshedpur in the state of Jharkhand. At  length, it is one of the shortest national highways in India. Before renumbering of national highways, route of NH-118 was part of old national highway 32. It is a spur road of National Highway 18.

Route 
NH118 links Asanbani at NH 18 with Jamshedpur in the state of Jharkhand.

Junctions  

  Terminal near Asanbani.

See also 
 List of National Highways in India by highway number
 List of National Highways in India by state
 National Highways Development Project

References

External links 
 NH 118 on OpenStreetMap

National highways in India
National Highways in Jharkhand
Transport in Jamshedpur